Lev Nikolaevich Orekhov (November 8, 1913, city of Tula, Moscow Region of the Russian Empire – November 6, 1992, Saint Petersburg, Russia) was a Russian Soviet painter, who lived and worked in Leningrad. He was regarded as one of the representatives of the Leningrad school of painting.

Biography 
Lev Nikolaevich Orekhov was born November 8, 1913, in the industrial city of Tula, located in Moscow region of the Russian Empire.

In 1932, Orekhov entered at the first course of the painting department of the Leningrad Institute of Painting, Sculpture and Architecture. There, he studied under Boris Fogel, Semion Abugov, Genrikh Pavlovsky.

In 1939, Lev Orekhov graduated from the Leningrad Institute of Painting, Sculpture and Architecture in Alexander Osmerkin workshop. His graduation work was a genre painting named A Rest of collective farmers in haymaking time during the lunch break.

From 1939, Lev Orekhov participated in art exhibitions. He painted portraits, landscapes, still-life, genre scenes, and sketches from the life. In the 1950s, he was most famous for his Crimea etudes done from nature, later for summer landscapes and genre scenes of Russian countryside life.

In the 1950s, Lev Orekhov painted plein air, with special attention to lighting and tonal relationships. He painted with an accented stroke. In the 1960s, his style morphed towards a more decorative and graphic quality of painting. His drawing and composition become more abstract.

Since 1946, Lev Orekhov was a member of the Leningrad Union of Soviet Artists. He died on November 6, 1992 in Saint Petersburg. His paintings reside in museums and private collections in Russia, France, England, the U.S., Italy, and other countries.

See also
 Leningrad School of Painting
 List of painters of Saint Petersburg Union of Artists
 List of the Russian Landscape painters
 Saint Petersburg Union of Artists

References

Bibliography 
 Russian Fine & Decorative Art. - Dallas, Texas: Heritage Auction Galleries, November 14, 2008. - p. 198.
 Sergei V. Ivanov. Unknown Socialist Realism. The Leningrad School. - Saint Petersburg: NP-Print Edition, 2007. – pp. 9, 27, 233, 295, 367, 386, 387, 390, 394-397, 400, 402, 404-406, 412, 414, 416-418, 420, 422, 423. , .

1913 births
1992 deaths
Soviet military personnel of World War II
20th-century Russian painters
Russian male painters
Soviet painters
Socialist realist artists
Leningrad School artists
Repin Institute of Arts alumni
Members of the Leningrad Union of Artists
Russian landscape painters
20th-century Russian male artists